Jønsberg Upper Secondary School is an upper secondary school in Stange, Norway.

It was established as Jønsberg School of Agriculture in 1847, and is the oldest school of agriculture still in existence in Norway. The current name stems from 2008.

References

External links
 Home page

Secondary schools in Norway
Education in Innlandet
Stange
Educational institutions established in 1847
1847 establishments in Norway
Hedmark County Municipality